Jiangling Holdings, also translated as Jiangling Motor Holding (JMH), is the name of two successive Jiangxi-based Chinese joint ventures focused on the automotive industry. The present Jiangling Holdings, established in June 2019 as a successor of the first one, is owned by state-controlled companies Jiangxi Guokong Automotive Investment Corporation (as majority holder), JMCG and Changan Auto. The first Jiangling Holdings was established in 2004 by JMCG and Changan as an equally-owned venture.

History

Old JMH
The first Jiangling Motor Holding joint venture was established in October 2004 (incorporated in November) as an equally-owned one by the state-owned enterprises Changan and JMCG. To create Jiangling Motor Holding, Changan invested money and in exchange JMCG transferred its Jiangling Motors (JMC) equity to the venture. Jiangling Motor Holding was from then on the largest shareholder of JMC, with a 41.03% stake as of March 2018. JMH also owned the Landwind marque.

Between 2005 and 2019, JMH's Landwind was the subject of complaints and legal demands by Jaguar Land Rover, with the latter alleging various illegal copies of its properties.

New JMH
In April 2019, it was announced that JMCG and Changan planned to split JMH into two separate companies: one keeping the same name and other tentatively called Jiangling Investment. Jiangling Investment would hold the 41.03% JMC stake and some liabilities and would still be equally owned by Changan and JMCG. The new JMH would own the rest of the former JMH assets (including Landwind) and it would issue 100% more shares to be sold to investors, leaving JMCG and Changan with a 25% stake each. Jiangling Investment was formally established in May 2019, completing the split of the former JMH. In June 2019, it was announced that the investor for the new JMH was the car manufacturer Aiways. Aiways acquired a 50% of the new JMH with the aim of securing production permits for new energy vehicles. The official signing ceremony for the new JMH was in August, but production of Aiways U5s at the JMH plant started in June, as soon as the deal was completed. In June 2021, Aiways sold its JMH stake to Jiangxi Guokong Automotive Investment Corporation, a company controlled by Nanchang's municipality, while keeping the production permits.

Operations
JMH is headquartered in Nanchang, China. The company owns the Landwind marque and produces all its models. It has also produced vehicles for its former largest shareholder, Aiways. 

Its Nanchang plant has the capacity to assemble up to 150,000 vehicles per year.

References

Car manufacturers of China
Vehicle manufacturing companies established in 2004
Vehicle manufacturing companies established in 2019
Jiangling Motors Corporation Group
Changan Automobile